Tuarii or Tūari'i (died 1911) was the queen regnant of Raiatea and Tahaa in the Leeward Islands of the Society Islands, part of present-day French Polynesia. She was the last monarch of the kingdom of Raiatea-Tahaa from 1887/1888 to 1897 before the conquest and annexation of the islands to France.

Tuarii was born into the ruling family of Raiatea. Her father was King Tahitoe and her sister Queen Tehauroa. A succession dispute gave the throne to a female-line cousin Tamatoa VI who submitted to French rule in 1888. In response, she and the minor chief Teraupo'o led a resistance government during the Raiatean rebellion (1887–1897) against the French. She unsuccessfully attempted to enlist the diplomatic support of the British by offering the islands to Queen Victoria and traveling to the British-controlled Cook Islands. The British refused to intervene. The rebellion ended with the surrender of Tuarii and her followers and the defeat and capture of Teraupo'o in 1897. She was pensioned off by the French colonial government and died in 1911.

Family 
Tuarii was a younger daughter of King Tahitoe of Raiatea and Tahaa who ruled from 1871 to 1881. Her grandfather Hihipa Tahitoe was the son of Vete'a-ra'i U'uru, the chief of Opoa, and grandson of King Tamatoa II of Raiatea from whom her family claimed the right to throne of Raiatea.

In 1880, King Tahitoe accepted the provisional protectorate by French commissioner Isidore Chessé. Tahitoe was deposed by his subjects for requesting the protectorate and his other daughter and successor Queen Tehauroa unsuccessfully attempted to enlist the protection of the British to preserve the independence of Raiatea in accordance with the Jarnac Convention of 1847. After Tehauroa's death in 1884, a civil war nearly broke out between two rivals for the throne. To avoid French intervention a female-line cousin and a junior member of the royal family of Huahine was installed as King Tamatoa VI.

Reign 

On 16 March 1888, the French annexed Raiatea and Tahaa after formal negotiation between Great Britain and France ended the 1847 Convention. In either 1887 or 1888, Tuarii was installed on the throne by the rebel chief Teraupo'o in opposition to King Tamatoa VI who had sided with the French. Her government and the resistance movement was centered at the village of Avera, located on the eastern coast of Raiatea. The Raiateans unsuccessfully appealed to Robert Teesdale Simons, the British Consul in Tahiti, for assistance and offered their country to Queen Victoria or the "Great White Queen". In 1895, Queen Tuarii traveled to the British protectorate of Rarotonga in the Cook Islands to seek help from the British Resident Frederick Moss who refused to meet with her.

The French appointed Governor Gustave Gallet to suppress the rebellion. Gallet had previous experience with suppressing the 1878 Kanak rebellion in New Caledonia. In 1896, two French warships, the cruiser  and the transporter , arrived from New Caledonia with two hundred French soldiers to quell the native resistance. The invasion force was further reinforced with a company of Tahitian volunteers. On 27 December 1896, Governor Gallet attempted to parley with the rebels to avoid bloodshed. He set an ultimatum for the rebels to surrender by 1 January 1897. The rebel government at Avera under Queen Tuarii and 1700 rebels reluctantly surrendered.

Teraupo'o and the rebels of Tahaa and the district of Tevaitoa refused the call to surrender and the rebellion ended after the rebel chief's capture after two months of guerilla warfare on 16 February 1897. The casualties of the six-week campaign were nearly fifty deaths mainly on the side of the Raiateans.

Later life and death 
Tuarii was offered an annual pension of 2,400 francs, but the French refused her request for pensions for members of her family. The French governor wrote: "Je vous laisse d’ailleurs le soin, si vous le jugez convenable, de prévenir Tuarii que si elle nous crée la moindre difficulté sa pension lui est retirée, car elle ne la doit qu’à notre extrême bienveillance en sa faveur" or "I leave it to you, if you find it appropriate, to warn Tuarii that if she creates any sort of difficulty, her pension will be withdrawn, given that she is only allowed it thanks to our extreme benevolence towards her". 

She died in 1911.

Ancestry

See also 

French Polynesia
Queen Mamea
Annexation of the Leeward Islands
List of monarchs of Raiatea
List of monarchs who lost their thrones in the 19th century

Notes

References

Bibliography 

Year of birth unknown
1911 deaths
19th-century monarchs in Oceania
19th-century women rulers
Protestant monarchs
French Polynesian royalty
Queens regnant in Oceania
People from Raiatea